"Billie's Blues" is a blues song written by jazz singer Billie Holiday, composing it just before being recorded in a session on July 10, 1936. According to the article in Melody Maker, on August 1, 1936:

Recording session
 "Did I Remember?"
 "Summertime"
 "No Regrets"
 "Billie's Blues"

Billie Holiday and Her Orchestra, (Bunny Berigan, trumpet; Artie Shaw, clarinet; Joe Bushkin, piano; Dick McDonough, guitar; Arthur "Pete" Peterson, bass; Cozy Cole, drums)

Notable cover versions
 Blossom Dearie (1957)
 Carmen McRae (1986)
 Mary Coughlan (2000)
 Jazz at the Philharmonic (2004)

Footnotes

Resource
Vladimir, Bogdanov. All Music Guide to the Blues: The Definitive Guide to the Blues, Backbeat Books (2003), p. 240,

External links
 The Unofficial Billie Holiday Website
 [ Song: Billie Blues]

Billie Holiday songs
1936 songs
1936 singles
Songs written by Billie Holiday